Bab al-Barqiyya was a gate in the city walls of Cairo, Egypt. It acted as one of the main eastern city gates until falling into disuse and disappearing. It was excavated and restored as part of the creation of Al-Azhar Park in the 2000s.

History 
Bab al-Barqiyya (also known as Bab al-Tawfiq) was originally an eastern gate in the Fatimid walls built by the vizier Badr al-Gamali. It was rebuilt in the 12th to 13th centuries under an ambitious fortification project begun in 1176 by Salah ad-Din (Saladin) and continued by his Ayyubid successors. This project included the construction of the Citadel of Cairo and of a 20 kilometer-long wall to defend both Cairo (originally the royal city of the Fatimid caliphs) and Fustat (the earlier capital of Egypt to the southwest). The entirety of the envisioned course of the wall was never quite completed, but long stretches of the wall, especially north of the Citadel, were built. Bab al-Barqiyya was one of the gates in this completed northern section, along with the gates identified as Bab al-Mahruq and Bab al-Jadid.

The gate was one of the main eastern gates of the city. Outside it was a desert area which was initially by the Mamluks used for equestrian games, a tradition started by Baybars and ended in 1320 by al-Nasir Muhammad. Later on, during the Burji Mamluk period, this area was the site of new Mamluk mausoleum complexes, now known as the Northern Cemetery. In the meantime, however, the city's growth and the relative security of the region made Bab al-Barqiyya's function as defensive gate less and less important. The gate, and the Ayyubid walls around it, fell into disuse and the inhabitants of the city built new houses and structures into them or on top of them. Over time, the eastern edge of the city, where the walls once stood, became a dumping ground for the city's detritus. The walls and gates disappeared under a growing mound of debris (though they remained largely intact).

In the early 2000s, the rubbish hills east of the historic city were transformed by the Aga Khan Trust for Culture into al-Azhar Park, opened in 2005. In the process, the eastern Ayyubid city walls were excavated and restored between 2000 and 2008, including Bab al-Barqiyya. The gate is now visible on the western edge of the park. Another nearby gate further south, Bab al-Mahruq, was also transformed into the western entrance to the park from the Darb al-Ahmar neighbourhood.

Description 

The gate, built in stone, had a complex design typical of Middle-Eastern medieval fortified gates known as a "bent entrance". Rather than a simple opening in the walls where traffic goes straight through, the gate forces traffic to pass sideways through the gate by effecting two 90-degree turns in and out of the gate.  This design was intended to impede direct assaults and force any attackers to slow down as they entered the gate.

References 

Gates of Cairo
Ayyubid architecture in Cairo